The Murphy Mound Archeological Site (23 PM 43), is a prehistoric archaeological site in the Bootheel region of the U.S. state of Missouri.  Located southwest of Caruthersville in Pemiscot County, Missouri the site was occupied by peoples of the Late Mississippian period, centuries before European colonization of the area.

Conclusive dates for the site's occupation have not been determined; one survey concluded that occupation began around 1200 CE and continued until at least 1400. A study of the site's pottery held that the location was inhabited from approximately 1350 until 1541.  The platform mound, now overgrown with trees, may be the largest of any Mississippian culture site in Missouri. It is located on private land and is not open to the public. A selection of the pots is displayed at the University of Missouri Museum of Anthropology.

Excavation at the site's cemetery has revealed ninety-one skeletons. These were buried in numerous fashions, including bundle burials, bodies fully extended, and cremations. In 1969, Murphy was listed on the National Register of Historic Places; it was the first site in Pemiscot County to be listed on the NRHP.

See also
 List of Mississippian sites
 Mississippi Valley: Culture, phase, and chronological periods table - List of archaeological periods

References

Further reading
O'Brien, Michael J. (1994) Cat Monsters and Head Pots. University of Missouri Press, Columbia.
O'Brien, Michael J. and Robert C. Dunnell. (1998) 1998 Changing Perspectives on the Archaeology of the Central Mississippi Valley. University of Missouri Press, Columbia.

Middle Mississippian culture
Mounds in Missouri
Native American history of Missouri
National Historic Landmarks in Missouri
Buildings and structures in Pemiscot County, Missouri
Archaeological sites on the National Register of Historic Places in Missouri
National Register of Historic Places in Pemiscot County, Missouri